Attila Racz (born 15 June 1973) is a Romanian rower. He competed in the men's coxless pair event at the 1996 Summer Olympics.

References

External links
 

1973 births
Living people
Romanian male rowers
Olympic rowers of Romania
Rowers at the 1996 Summer Olympics
Place of birth missing (living people)